Mark Colyvan is an Australian philosopher and Professor of Philosophy at the  University of Sydney. He is a former president of the Australasian Association of Philosophy. Colyvan is known for his research on philosophy of mathematics.

Books
 The Indispensability of Mathematics, Oxford University Press, 2001
 Ecological Orbits: How Planets Move and Populations Grow, Oxford University Press, 2004
 An Introduction to the Philosophy of Mathematics, Cambridge University Press, 2012

References

External links
Personal Website
Mark Colyvan at the University of Sydney

Living people
21st-century Australian philosophers
20th-century Australian philosophers
Analytic philosophers
Philosophy academics
Philosophers of mathematics
Philosophers of logic
Australian National University alumni
University of New England (Australia) alumni
Academic staff of the University of Sydney
Year of birth missing (living people)